Mills is an unincorporated rural hamlet in northeastern Keya Paha County, Nebraska, United States.  It lies along local roads northeast of the village of Springview, the county seat of Keya Paha County.  Its elevation is 1,919 feet (585 m).  Although Mills has a post office, covering the ZIP code of 68753, Google Maps cartographers didn't bother mapping the hamlet or its vicinity. The ZCTA for the entire ZIP code 68753 had a population of 106 at the 2000 census, some of whom live outside the hamlet itself.

History
Mills is named for a gristmill in the location. The Mills post office was established in the 1880s.

References

Unincorporated communities in Keya Paha County, Nebraska
Unincorporated communities in Nebraska